Mayuri Upadhya (born 30 December 1979) is an Indian choreographer, dancer, entrepreneur and TV personality based in Bengaluru, India. She is also the Artistic Director of the Bengaluru-based dance organisation, Nritarutya.

In January 2018, Mayuri was voted the Best Choreographer by BroadwayWorld, for the longest running musical in Indian history. Mayuri is the winner of the International Choreography Award, Seoul, Uday Shankar Awards for Choreography, and a Manav Ratna for her contribution to Indian arts and culture, in addition to numerous other awards.

Biography

Family and Training 
Mayuri was born in the coastal town of Udupi, Karnataka to Muralidhar Upadhya and Shamala Upadhya on 30 December 1979. She is the youngest of two siblings. Her elder sister Madhuri Upadhya is also a choreographer, and is the Associate Director of Nritarutya.

Mayuri is an alumnus of Sri Vani Education Centre and a graduate from  MES College of Arts, Commerce & Science.

Training 
She trained in Bharatanatyam under Indira Kadambi and Minal Prabhu, and Odissi under Uday Shetty. She has also trained in Kathak under Guru Maya Rao and Jayanthi Eswarputhi, and Kalaripayattu under Ranjan Mullaratt. She also has the Arts Council England’s Artist Management credentials to her credit.

Career 
Mayuri’s career has foraged beyond the traditional dance network. Her canvas of work depicts a wide range. A beautifully balanced mix of visual interpretations, cultural sensitivity, conditioning future generations, and capacity building, marks her two decades long journey.

The spectrum of her creativity features the cinemascopic renditions, experimental works, emotion-stirring choreography on one hand (her contemporary work, Bollywood movies like Mirzya, the epic musical ‘Mughal-e-Azam’ and ‘Raunaq and Jassi’, and Harivanshrai Bachchan's ‘Madhushala’, to name a few), and her curatorial and conceptualizing prowess on the other hand (designing and leading the Sublime's Teaching for Arts India initiative, curating the dance portfolio for Serendipity Arts Festival (2019-2020), and actively working in preserving and promoting cultural traditions by presenting it in the modern context). And to top it all, Bangalore based dance organization Nritarutya is growing steady and strong under her artistic direction.

Artistic Director - Nritarutya 
Founded in 2000, Nritarutya, today, has become one of the foremost contemporary dance organisations in the country with path-breaking creative works, pioneering employment reforms for artists, and introducing creative platforms like Adhyaya and Prayog to the dance fraternity.

Adhyaya, is Nritarutya's festival of dance, celebrating innovation and tradition. It programs and showcases never-before-seen works for Bangalore audiences, inviting artists from across the world with works that is an amalgamation of “innovation and tradition”. Most of the times, artists have created a new piece just to be showcased at Adhayaya. For the first time in 2018, Adhyaya opened its doors to applications from artists the world over seeking an avant garde platform to perform their works in, receiving a whopping 120 entries.

Mayuri's experimental creation initiative Prayog, is a festival that commissions and showcases out-of-the-box Indian dance compositions. All the commissions follow the rule of interpreting mythology in contemporary ways, and is often a melting pot of designers, musicians, painters, choreographers, dancers, and theatre artists.

She got critical acclaim in 2004 with her work ‘Ardhanarishwara’, which talked about the masculinity and the femininity residing within each of us. Oum, Yantra, Footnote, Dwandwa, are few of her earliest works.
 
After a commission by the Wadiyar of Mysore to create a piece for their kul-devi (family Deity), Mayuri choreographed the highly acclaimed and successful ‘Kali’ in the year 2008, which talks about the deepest recesses of our unconsciousness which is wild, raw and untamed.

‘Parched – 1st Cut’, was created for the Serendipity Arts Festival 2016. The scarcity of water, humankind's mistakes and the obscure truth of our future the highlights of this piece.

‘Parched – Choreographer’s Cut’ is a work-in-progress full length production which Mayuri is working on currently.

As an independent Choreographer 

In 2019, Mayuri choreographed the musical Raunaq and Jassi, directed by Feroze Abbas Khan, and produced by Book My Show. It is a Punjabi take on Romeo and Juliet. Her expertise is sought to choreograph on typical Punjabi folk numbers in the musical.

In 2017, Mayuri choreographed the musical Mughal-e-Azam – the play rendition of the 1960s hit movie of the same name. The musical has been the longest running musical in Indian history. Mayuri was voted Best Choreographer by the Broadway World in 2018 for Mughal-E-Azam.

In 2017, Mayuri was invited by TED Talks India Nayi Soch to visually interpret the #100sareepact speaker Anju Kadam's talk on the 6 yard drape, Saree, and choreograph a short sequence.

In 2016 she worked with the Rakeysh Om Prakash Mehra Productions for the movie Mirzya, as a choreographer., for which she was nominated at for the Star Guild Awards for Best Choreographer.

In 2015, Mayuri won the prestigious Uday Shankar Award for Choreography.

The same year, she was commissioned by the Prime Minister of India to create a special dance sequence for the Make In India week in Germany, following which, she was commissioned again to create another piece for the Make In India Week in Mumbai, in 2016. Make In India inaugural dance sequence won the European Event Award for the Best Cultural Performance.

In 2014, she choreographed and created another musical, Madhur Milan, for the Industrialist Kokilaben Ambani.

In 2012, she choreographed her first musical – Madhushala – the cinemascopic rendition of the popular poetry epic Madhushala by Harivanshrai Bachchan, which was commissioned by Amitabh Bachchan, for his 70th birthday celebrations – B70.

In 2012, she also performed with the Raghu Dixit Project for Queen Elizabeth’s Jubilee Celebrations in the UK.

She also represented India at the International Competition for Choreography Concept in Seoul, South Korea, and was one of the winners there.

She is currently working on the Government of India's Red Fort Project - commissioned by the Dalmia group, and produced by Humor Me, for designing the "sound and light" show for the iconic monument of Red Fort.

She was also one of the artists in focus for The Dewarists Season 3, where she collaborated with Raghu Dixit, Harun Robert and Sridhar for a multi disciplinary dance sequence.

Over the past years, Mayuri has also worked with various fashion designers, like Abu Jaani - Sandeep Khosla, Tarun Tahiliani, Sabyasachi, Anju Modi, Hemant Trivedi, Manish Arora and Wendell Rodricks, and choreographed dance pieces inspired by their fashion lines.

She is also the only choreographer who was invited to create a concept choreography commemorating the martyrs of the 26/11 shooting. It featured megastar Shri Amitabh Bachchan. Event was titled '26/11 - Stories of Strength', a memorial event organised by The Indian Express Group

As an Entrepreneur and Educationist 
Mayuri's work can best be described as a mélange of creativity, entrepreneurship and education.

With Nritarutya, she has pioneered a career module of an artistic company, with a secure salary system and health benefits that compares to the corporate sector. With her independent work, she has incorporated artistic work of different scale and range in her projects. And her capacity building initiatives feature Prayog, Adhyaya, and Sublime's Teaching For Artistic Innovation, which is designed to enhance the creative faculties of children, by using dance as a medium.

For the prestigious Serendipity Arts Festival, Mayuri is the Curator of Dance programs for 2019 and 2020. She is also a panelist at Makers India conference by YourStory on Women's Day (2020)

As a TV artist: 

Mayuri is one of the judges for the dancing reality shows Dancing Stars Seasons 2 and 3 (a BBC production), Master Dancer (a Viacom 18 production on Colors Network) and Dancing Champion (a Lokesh Productions).

Popular works and projects 

 Kalank (Bollywood, Dharma Productions Film) - Creative consultant and concept design for the song ‘Ghar More Pardesiya’ 
 Shikara (Bollywood, Vidhu Vinod Chopra Film) - Concept and choreography for the song "Mar Jaye hum" 
 Raunaq and Jassi (musical) 
 Mughal-E-Azam (musical)
 Dancing Stars Seasons 2 & 3 (Dance Reality show)
 Master Dancer (Dance Reality Show)
 Madhushala (musical)
 Madhur Milan (musical)
 Make In India Ceremony (Stage creation)
 Parched (Contemporary work)
 Pro Kabbadi League (Stage creation)
 Mirzya (Bollywood)
 Featured in Teachers Genuine Stories - hosted by Rahul Bose featured an exclusive segment on Mayuri and her journey.
 Dewarists Season 3 Finale (Musical TV Series)
 Teaching For Artistic Innovation (Dance in Education Program)
 Choreographed for Mahashivratri celebrations at IshaCenter (2017) 
 PATA (Stage)
 Queen Elizabeth's Golden Jubilee Celebration at Windsor Castle (represented Asia)
 Ijjodu (Kannada film) - Choreography for the movie
 Thamassu (Kannada Film) - Choreography for the title song “thamassu”
 Pancharangi (Kannada Film) - Choreography for the song “udisuve”

Television

Awards 

 Broadway World Award for Best Choreographer for Mughal-E-Azam (2018)
 Mysore Rotary's women Achiever award - in recognition of her contribution in arts, felicitated by Smt.Gayathri Devi- The queen of Mysore. (2018)
 "Manav Ratna" award for contribution in the field of Arts and Culture (2013)
 International Competition for choreography concept, South Korea (2012)
 RAPA Best Choreographer Award for Television Commercials, Chennai (2005)
 Young Women's Achievement Award (2004)
 Uday Shankar Award

References

External links
The Nritarutya Dance Collective official website
Mayuri Upadhya on IMDb

Artistic directors
Living people
Indian classical choreographers
Performers of Indian classical dance
Artists from Bangalore
Indian women choreographers
Dancers from Karnataka
1979 births